Parmotrema arnoldii, commonly known as the powdered ruffle lichen, is a widely distributed species of lichen in the family Parmeliaceae. It has been recorded from Africa, Asia, Europe, Oceania, Macaronesia, and North and South America.

Taxonomy
The lichen was first described in the scientific literature as Parmelia nilgherrensis by William Nylander in 1874. This taxon was later (1875) transferred by Ferdinand Arnold into Imbricaria (a now obsolete genus name sunk into Anaptychia). However, Nylander's 1874 publication of this species is an illegitimate homonym, as he had previously published this name with a different type in 1869. In 1924, Gustaf Einar Du Rietz described the same taxon as Parmelia arnoldii. Mason Hale transferred it to Parmotrema in 1974, as part of a taxonomic transfer of all species in Parmelia subgenus Parmelia section Irregulare. It is commonly known as the powdered ruffle lichen.

Description
Parmotrema arnoldii has a pale grey thallus comprising lobes that measure 6–15 mmm wide. The thallus lacks maculae (spots or lines free of photobiont). There are soralia present on the upper surface of the tips of the lobes, which causes them to curl downwards. The lobes, especially those lacking soredia, have abundant, long cilia. The lower surface of the thallus (the subthallus) is black to brown and has a naked marginal zone (i.e. without rhizines). Secondary compounds present are atranorin,  alectoronic and α-collatolic acids, sometimes accompanied also by skyrin.

Similar species
Parmotrema margaritatum is identical in appearance, but it has salazinic acid. Cetrelia chicitae is similar in morphology to Parmotrema arnoldii and produces the same secondary substances. However, unlike P. arnoldii, it has pseudocyphellae and thallus margins without cilia.

Habitat and distribution
Parmotrema arnoldii is widely distributed, and has been recorded from temperate locations in Africa, Asia, Europe, Oceania, Macaronesia, and North and South America. Typically growing among mosses that associate with plants, often on old shrubs or horizontal tree branches, the lichen prefers relatively well-lit and humid undisturbed woodlands.

See also
List of Parmotrema species

References

Lichen species
Lichens described in 1924
Lichens of Africa
Lichens of Asia
Lichens of Europe
Lichens of North America
Lichens of Oceania
Lichens of South America
arnoldii
Lichens of Macaronesia